Autraumaton is the debut album by Canadian Cyberrockers The Rabid Whole. The album was released on March 3, 2009 by Synthetic Sounds and was mastered by Shaun Thingvold.

Track listing

References

External links 
 Autraumaton on Amazon.ca
 Autraumaton on Amazon MP3 Store

2009 debut albums
The Rabid Whole albums